The 1982 Castrol 400 was an endurance race for touring cars complying with CAMS Group C regulations. The event was held at the Sandown Raceway circuit in Victoria on 12 September 1982 over 109 laps, totalling 337.9 km.
The field was divided into four classes according to engine capacity:
Class A : Up to 1600 cc
Class B : 1601 - 2000 cc
Class C : 2001 - 3000 cc
Class D : 3001 - 6000 cc
There were 52 starters in the event, which was the second round of the 1982 Australian Endurance Championship and the second round of the 1982 Australian Endurance Championship of Makes.

Allan Moffat's win in his Peter Stuyvesant International Mazda RX-7 was the first outright win by a car from a Japanese manufacturer in the annual Sandown endurance race.

Results

References

Australian Motor Racing Yearbook, 1982/83
CAMS Manual of Motor Sport, 1982
Racing Car News, September 1982
The Age, Monday, 13 September 1982
The Australian Racing History of Ford © 1989
The Official Racing History of Holden © 1988

See also
1982 Castrol 400 - full race

Motorsport at Sandown
Castrol 400
Pre-Bathurst 500